In aerospace engineering, mass ratio is a measure of the efficiency of a rocket. It describes how much more massive the vehicle is with propellant than without; that is, the ratio of the rocket's wet mass (vehicle plus contents plus propellant) to its dry mass (vehicle plus contents).  A more efficient rocket design requires less propellant to achieve a given goal, and would therefore have a lower mass ratio; however, for any given efficiency a higher mass ratio typically permits the vehicle to achieve higher delta-v.

The mass ratio is a useful quantity for back-of-the-envelope rocketry calculations: it is an easy number to derive from either  or from rocket and propellant mass, and therefore serves as a handy bridge between the two.  It is also a useful for getting an impression of the size of a rocket: while two rockets with mass fractions of, say, 92% and 95% may appear similar, the corresponding mass ratios of 12.5 and 20 clearly indicate that the latter system requires much more propellant.

Typical multistage rockets have mass ratios in the range from 8 to 20.  The Space Shuttle, for example, has a mass ratio around 16.

Derivation 

The definition arises naturally from Tsiolkovsky's rocket equation:

where
Δv is the desired change in the rocket's velocity
ve is the effective exhaust velocity (see specific impulse)
m0 is the initial mass (rocket plus contents plus propellant)
m1 is the final mass (rocket plus contents)

This equation can be rewritten in the following equivalent form:

The fraction on the left-hand side of this equation is the rocket's mass ratio by definition.

Alternative definition 

Sutton defines the mass ratio inversely as:

In this case, the values for mass fraction are always less than 1.

See also 
 Rocket fuel
 Propellant mass fraction
 Payload fraction

References 

Astrodynamics
Mass
Ratios